The 1993 Nottinghamshire County Council election was held on Thursday, 6 May 1993. The whole council of eighty-eight members was up for election.

The Labour Party retained control of the Council, increasing its number of councillors to fifty-eight. The Conservatives suffered a net loss of ten seats and won twenty-four councillors. The Liberal Democrats won six seats.

Results by division
Each electoral division returned one county councillor. The candidate elected to the council in each electoral division is shown in the table below. "Unopposed" indicates that the councillor was elected unopposed.

References

1993
1993 English local elections
1990s in Nottinghamshire